Quinalizarin or 1,2,5,8-tetrahydroxyanthraquinone is an organic compound with formula . It is one of many tetrahydroxyanthraquinone isomers, formally derived from anthraquinone by replacement of four hydrogen atoms by hydroxyl (OH) groups.

Quinalizarin is an inhibitor of the enzyme protein kinase CK2. It is more potent and selective than emodin. It is also a potent catechol O-methyltransferase (COMT) inhibitor.

See also
 1,4-Dihydroxyanthraquinone (quinizarin)
 Alizarin, a related simpler dye

References

3-Hydroxypropenals
Catechol-O-methyltransferase inhibitors
Catechols
Hydroquinones
Tetrahydroxyanthraquinones